is a Japanese ice hockey player for Göteborg HC of the Swedish Women's Hockey League (SDHL) and the Japanese national team. She has previously played for the Toronto Furies of the Canadian Women's Hockey League (CWHL) and the Seibu Princess Rabbits of the Women's Japan Ice Hockey League (WJIHL).

Playing career

CWHL
In 2015, Suzuki was drafted in the 8th Round of the 2015 CWHL Draft by the Toronto Furies. She scored her 1st goal with the Furies on 6 December 2015, against the Calgary Inferno. The goal ended up being the game-winner for Toronto. The historic goal for Suzuki came two days after she was named to play in the 2nd Canadian Women's Hockey League All-Star Game. Suzuki made history as the first international player (born outside of Canada and the United States) to participate in the CWHL All-Star Game.

International 
Suzuki competed at both the 2014 and the 2018 Winter Olympics. She participated at the 2015 IIHF Women's World Championship.

Career Statistics

References

External links

1991 births
Living people
Competitors at the 2015 Winter Universiade
Ice hockey players at the 2014 Winter Olympics
Ice hockey players at the 2018 Winter Olympics
Ice hockey players at the 2022 Winter Olympics
Japanese expatriate sportspeople in Canada
Japanese women's ice hockey defencemen
Olympic ice hockey players of Japan
Sportspeople from Hokkaido
Toronto Furies players
Universiade bronze medalists for Japan
Universiade medalists in ice hockey
Asian Games medalists in ice hockey
Ice hockey players at the 2011 Asian Winter Games
Ice hockey players at the 2017 Asian Winter Games
Medalists at the 2011 Asian Winter Games
Medalists at the 2017 Asian Winter Games
Asian Games gold medalists for Japan
Asian Games silver medalists for Japan
Göteborg HC players
AIK Hockey Dam players
Expatriate ice hockey players in Sweden
Japanese expatriate ice hockey people
Expatriate ice hockey players in Canada